Brudevold is a Norwegian surname. Notable people with the surname include:

 Finn Brudevold (1910–2006), Norwegian-American odontologist and educator
 Trygve Brudevold (1920–2021), Norwegian bobsledder 

Norwegian-language surnames